This is a list of singles that have peaked in the Top 10 of the Billboard Hot 100 during 1966.

The Beatles, The Lovin' Spoonful, and The Rolling Stones each had five top-ten hits in 1966, tying them for the most top-ten hits during the year.

Top-ten singles

1965 peaks

1967 peaks

See also
 1966 in music
 List of Hot 100 number-one singles of 1966 (U.S.)
 Billboard Year-End Hot 100 singles of 1966

References

General sources

Joel Whitburn Presents the Billboard Hot 100 Charts: The Sixties
Additional information obtained can be verified within Billboard's online archive services and print editions of the magazine.

United States Hot 100 Top 10
1966